Geodorcus helmsi, New Zealand giant stag beetle or Helms's stag beetle is a large, slow-moving, flightless stag beetle in the family Lucanidae. It is endemic to New Zealand.

Description
Geodorcus helmsi varies in colour from black to brownish-black. Its dorsal surface can vary from dull to glossy. Like other stag beetles, they show sexual dimorphism: males range in size from 17.5–44.0 mm, including their large mandibles, while females are smaller (16.5–27.5 mm) with less conspicuous mandibles. In larger male specimens, the mandibles are long, slender and strongly arched with a conspicuous tooth near their base. G. helmsi is distinguished from other Geodorcus by its straight un-arched tibiae, and five setose ridges on the elytra.

Distribution
Geodorcus helmsi is the most widespread of the ten Geodorcus species, having been collected from Karamea on the northern West Coast of New Zealand to the south of the South Island, as far as Tapanui in West Otago. It has also been collected from islands in Fiordland and from Stewart Island. Adults have a wide altitudinal range, from sea level to 1400 m.

Habitat
All Geodorcus species are mainly nocturnal and hide underneath fallen log stones or leaf litter on the forest floor. At night D. helmsi have been seen active on tree trunks, chewing at the bark to get access to the exudate. This species occupies a highly variable habitat, including forest and tussock-dominated high country.

Diet
The feeding ecology of adult G. helmsi may be highly variable: they occupy a wide range of habitats from forest to the tussock zone in the high country. Adults have been observed on tree trunks feeding on sappy exudate from wounds in the bark. Larvae of other lucanid beetles commonly eat the surface of rotting wood. Geodorcus larvae have been observed to have large quantities of humus inside their gut.

Life cycle
In New Zealand stag beetles, there is no published information about the duration or timing of oviposition, larval, pupal and adult stages of the life cycle. Copulation has been observed in October. Larvae of Geodorcus have been seen under decaying logs, occupying a gallery in the soil layer. They are "C" shaped, slow moving, and avoid the light.

Conservation
All Geodorcus species are protected under Schedule 7 of The 1953 Wildlife Act, making it illegal to hunt, kill, or possess a specimen. Predation by introduced rats has reduced the population density of G. helmsi; on islands where rats are present, only their remains can be found. This species has been found to make up to 27% of the dry weight of feral pig stomach contents.

References

External links 
 Geodorcus helmsi discussed on RNZ Critter of the Week, 31 May 2019

Lucaninae
Beetles of New Zealand
Endemic fauna of New Zealand
Beetles described in 1881
Endemic insects of New Zealand